"Aircompany "SIBIA" ltd (Общество с ограниченной ответственностью «Авиакомпания «СИБИА», Obçestvo s ograničennoj otvetstvennostjju «Aviakompanija») is a Russian airline specialising in various forms of aerial work including crop-spraying, medical flights and search-and-rescue. It also provided charter passenger services. In 2007 it was taken over by ChelAvia who mainly deal with airline training/teaching and aircraft sales but who also provide aerial work themselves.

Fleet

Incidents
On June 1, 2002, the CEO personally vowed to investigate an incident where youths came across and hijacked an Antonov An-2 about to take off in Nagaybaksky District (Chelyabinsk Oblast); they flew it over the town for a while. They were apprehended on landing and later charged.

References

External links 
 russianplanes.net ООО «Авиакомпания «СИБИА»
 Antonov An-2 RA-40487
 Antonov An-2 RA-40487
 fotografersha. Споттинг в Кургане
 Aviator.ru, Сергей Мартиросян. Прелести споттинга в аэропортах малой интенсивности
 

Airlines of Russia
Companies based in Kurgan, Kurgan Oblast